An enzyme repressor is a substance that negatively regulates the amount of an enzyme by decreasing the rate of its biosynthesis. It is the opposite of an enzyme inducer.

See also 
 Enzyme activator
 Enzyme inhibitor
 Regulation of gene expression

References 

Medicinal chemistry
Enzymes
Metabolism